Coenraad Jacob Temminck Catalogue systématique du cabinet d'ornithologie et de la collection de quadrumanes de Crd. Jb. Temminck. Avec une courte description des oiseaux non-decrits Amsterdam Chez C. Sepp Jansz.See Erwin Stresemann, Analyse von C. J. Temmincks "Catalogue systématique" (1807), Zoologische Mededelingen Vol. 31, 1953, p. 319-331 PDF
Birds described in 1807 include the Oriental pied hornbill, the double-banded courser, the black-collared starling and the black-headed munia.
After three years in Java Jean-Baptiste Leschenault de La Tour returns to France with a large collection of plants and birds. His Javanese birds were described by Georges Cuvier.
Death of Pierre Joseph Buchoz.

Birding and ornithology by year
1807 in science